Oak Hill is a hamlet within the town of Durham in Greene County, New York, United States. It has the ZIP Code 12460 and the Telephone Area Code 518.

It is the location of Oak Hill Methodist Episcopal Church, and the Oak Hill Cemetery, which are listed on the U.S. National Register of Historic Places. The Catskill Creek and Tenmile Creek are prominent features in the landscape of the community. Oak Hill is home to one of the Twelve Tribes communities.

The Grey Fox Bluegrass Festival has been held in Oak Hill every July since 2008, with the exception of 2020.

See also
Hamlets in New York

References 

Hamlets in New York (state)
Hamlets in Greene County, New York